Nizhny Olshanets is a rural locality (a selo) in Belgorodsky District, Belgorod Oblast, Russia. The population was 250 as of 2010. There are 22 streets.

Geography 
Nizhny Olshanets is located 27 km east of Maysky (the district's administrative centre) by road. Razumnoye is the nearest rural locality.

References 

Rural localities in Belgorodsky District
Belgorodsky Uyezd